, , , or  (ځ) is a Pashto letter representing the sibilant affricative sound. In size and shape, it is a ḥāʾ with a hamza above. It is written in several ways depending on its position in the word:

Pashto